Tilo Baumgärtel (born 1972) is a German painter. He currently lives and works in Leipzig.

Baumgärtel was born in Dresden. He attended the Hochschule für Grafik und Buchkunst Leipzig from 1991 to 1994.

He is part of a group of young painters based in Leipzig, along with Matthias Weischer, Christoph Ruckhaberle and others. The common trait of the group is their production of large figurative oil paintings.  His paintings derive from social realist works and propaganda posters in their draughtsmanship and dramatic use of shadow.

Baumgärtel has shown work in exhibitions including “7 x Malerei” at Museum der Bildenden Künste in Leipzig, FUTURE/Five Artists From Germany at Sandroni.Rey Gallery in Los Angeles, Painting Show at Wilkinson Gallery in London and Life After Death at Massachusetts Museum of Contemporary Art.

He is represented by Wilkinson Gallery in London, Christian Ehrentraut in Berlin and Adam Biesk in Los Angeles.

See also
 List of German painters

External links
Tilo Baumgärtel at Adam Biesk
Tilo Baumgärtel at Christian Ehrentraut
Tilo Baumgärtel at the Saatchi Gallery

1972 births
20th-century German painters
20th-century German male artists
German male painters
German contemporary artists
21st-century German painters
21st-century German male artists
Living people
Hochschule für Grafik und Buchkunst Leipzig alumni